Joseph Alphonse McNicholas (January 13, 1923 – April 17, 1983) was an American prelate of the Roman Catholic Church.  He served as the sixth bishop of the Diocese of Springfield in Illinois from 1975 to until his death in 1983.  He previously served as an auxiliary bishop of the Archdiocese of St. Louis in Missouri from 1969 to 1975.

Biography

Early life 
Joseph McNicholas was born on January 23, 1923, in St. Louis, Missouri.  He attended  Cardinal Glennon College in Shrewsbury, Missouri, and Kenrick Seminary in St. Louis. He was ordained to the priesthood on June 7, 1949 by Cardinal Joseph Elmer Ritter. After his ordination, McNicholas' first assignment was as an assistant pastor at the Old Cathedral of St. Louis Parish.  He was transferred in 1955 to Most Holy Name of Jesus Parish in St. Louis as a part time associate pastor while studying for his Master of Social Work degree at St. Louis University.

Auxiliary Bishop of St. Louis 
On January 31, 1969, McNicholas was appointed as an auxiliary bishop of the Archdiocese of St. Louis and titular bishop of Scala by Pope Paul VI. He received his episcopal consecration in St. Louis on March 25, 1969, from Cardinal John Carberry, with Archbishop Leo Byrne and Bishop Charles Helmsing serving as co-consecrators. As auxiliary bishop, McNicholas also served as pastor of the Old Cathedral of St. Louis Parish, and was active in social welfare and youth programs.

Bishop of Springfield 
Pope Paul VI appointed McNicholas as bishop of the Diocese of Springfield on July 22, 1975. He was installed by Cardinal John Cody on September 3,  1975. He became personally acquainted with the diocese by launching a visitation of churches, missions, schools, hospitals, the orphanage, and homes for senior citizens. He hosted the first Midwest Regional Meeting of the St. Vincent de Paul Society to be held in downstate Illinois, and in 1978 appointed the first nun to the position of superintendent of Catholic schools. He also renamed the diocesan newspaper as Time and Eternity.

Joseph McNicholas died on April 17, 1983, from a heart attack at age 60.

References

Roman Catholic Archdiocese of St. Louis
1923 births
1983 deaths
Clergy from St. Louis
Kenrick–Glennon Seminary alumni
20th-century Roman Catholic bishops in the United States
Roman Catholic bishops of Springfield in Illinois
Religious leaders from Missouri